Pet Sematary is a 1983 horror novel by Stephen King.

Pet Sematary may also refer to:
 Pet Sematary (1989 film), a horror film based on the Stephen King novel
 Pet Sematary (soundtrack), Elliot Goldenthal's score to the 1989 film
 "Pet Sematary" (song), a 1989 single from the Ramones album Brain Drain, originally written for the 1989 film
 Pet Sematary Two, a 1992 sequel film
 Pet Sematary (2019 film), a horror film based on the Stephen King novel

See also 
 Pet cemetery
 Gates of Heaven — 1978 documentary film about a pet cemetery 
"Pet Cemetery", a song by Tierra Whack from Whack World
 Cemetery (disambiguation)